Dumri is a village in the Dumri CD block in the Dumri subdivision of the Giridih district in the Indian state of Jharkhand.

Geography

Location

Area overview
Giridih district is a part of the Chota Nagpur plateau, with rocky soil and extensive forests. Most of the rivers in the district flow from the west to east, except in the northern portion where the rivers flow north and north west. The district has coal and mica mines. It is an overwhelmingly rural district with small pockets of urbanisation. 

Note: The map alongside presents some of the notable locations in the district. All places marked in the map are linked in the larger full screen map.

Demographics
According to the 2011 Census of India, Dumri had a total population of 5,639, of which 2,935 (52%) were males and 2,704 (48%) were females. Population in the age range 0-6 years was 896. The total number of literate persons in Dumri was 3,305 (69.68% of the population over 6 years).

Civic administration

Police station
Dumri police station has jurisdiction over a part of the Dumri CD block. According to old British records, Dumri PS was there after the Giridh subdivision was formed in 1870.

CD block HQ
The headquarters of the Dumri CD block are located at Dumri village.

Transport
NH 19 (old numbering NH 2)/ Grand Trunk Road passes through Dumri.

Education
Jharkhand College, Dumri was established in 1985. It is affiliated with Vinoba Bhave University. It offers courses in arts, science and commerce.

References

Villages in Giridih district